Sir Thomas James Dixon, 2nd Baronet, PC (NI) (29 May 1868 – 10 May 1950), was a Northern Ireland politician.

Dixon was the eldest son of Sir Daniel Dixon, 1st Baronet, Lord Mayor of Belfast, and his wife, Eliza (née Agnew). He succeeded his father as second Baronet in 1907. Dixon was a Member of the Senate of Northern Ireland from 1924 to 1950, and was admitted to the Privy Council of Northern Ireland in 1931. He served as High Sheriff of Antrim in 1912, and of County Down in 1913. He was Lord Lieutenant of Belfast between 1924 and 1950.

Dixon married Edith Stewart Clark on 7 February 1906. He died in May 1950, aged 81, and was succeeded in the baronetcy by his younger brother Herbert, who had already been elevated to the peerage as Baron Glentoran.

In 1919, Dixon purchased Wilmont House and its estates in Belfast for £21,500. Lady Dixon was appointed Dame Commander of the Order of the British Empire (DBE) for her services during World War I.

Legacy
Sir Thomas and Lady Dixon Park opened the same year.

References

Sources
Kidd, Charles, Williamson, David (editors). Debrett's Peerage and Baronetage (1990 edition). New York: St Martin's Press, 1990.

1868 births
1950 deaths
Baronets in the Baronetage of the United Kingdom
High Sheriffs of Antrim
High Sheriffs of Down
Lord-Lieutenants of Belfast
Members of the Senate of Northern Ireland 1921–1925
Members of the Senate of Northern Ireland 1925–1929
Members of the Senate of Northern Ireland 1929–1933
Members of the Senate of Northern Ireland 1933–1937
Members of the Senate of Northern Ireland 1937–1941
Members of the Senate of Northern Ireland 1941–1945
Members of the Senate of Northern Ireland 1945–1949
Members of the Privy Council of Northern Ireland
Linen industry in Ireland
Place of birth missing
Place of death missing
Ulster Unionist Party members of the Senate of Northern Ireland